The men's 400 metre individual medley event at the 11th FINA World Swimming Championships (25m) took place 13 December 2012 at the Sinan Erdem Dome.

Records
Prior to this competition, the existing world and championship records were as follows.

No new records were set during this competition.

Results

Heats

43 swimmers participated in 5 heats.

Final

The final was held at 19:10.

References

External links
 2012 FINA World Swimming Championships (25 m): Men's 400 metre medley entry list, from OmegaTiming.com.

Individual medley 400 metre, men's
World Short Course Swimming Championships